Madrecita, Te Debo Tanto is the first collaborative album by Al Hurricane, Al Hurricane, Jr., Baby Gaby, Gloria Pohl, Lorenzo Antonio, & Tiny Morrie. It is the tenth full-length album released by the New Mexican musician Al Hurricane in 1980.

Johnny Tapia would often shout the words "Madrecita, Te Debo Tanto" if he won by knock out. He attributed this to El Godfather of New Mexico, Al Hurricane.

Track listing

References

Al Hurricane albums
New Mexico music albums